This list of Liberia-flagged cargo ships consists of vessels which are registered in Liberia and subject to the laws of that country. Liberia is the world's second most prolific flag state by both tonnage and number of ships, largely due to its status as a flag of convenience. A total of 2,496 bulk carriers, container ships, and general cargo ships flew the Liberian flag in 2021. Any ship which flew the flag at any point in its career, and is present in the encyclopedia, is listed here.

List of ships

References 

Liberia
~